Corona station is an Edmonton Light Rail Transit station in Edmonton, Alberta, Canada. It serves both the Capital Line and the Metro Line. It is an underground station located beneath Jasper Avenue between 107 Street and 108 Street. It is the closest station to NorQuest College.

History
Corona station was opened in June 1983 along with Bay station when the LRT system was extended by 0.8 km beneath Jasper Avenue from Central station. The station was named after the Corona Hotel which was located on the current site of First Edmonton Place, an office tower directly above the station. The station and First Edmonton Place both opened in 1983.

Corona station was the southern terminus of the LRT line prior to the opening of Grandin station in September 1989.

Station layout
The station has a 403.5 ft. (123-metre) long centre loading platform that can accommodate two five-car LRT trains at the same time, with one train on each side of the platform.  The platform is just over 26 feet (eight metres) wide. Access to the platform is from the concourse level by stairs and escalators located at each end of the platform. Unlike other downtown stations, the concourse level at Corona is not connected to the Edmonton pedway system.

Around the station
Alberta Blue Cross
Alberta Education
Downtown
First Edmonton Place
Intact Building
NorQuest College

References

External links

Edmonton Light Rail Transit stations
Railway stations in Canada opened in 1983
Capital Line
Metro Line